Ninna Sanihake is a 2021 Indian Kannada-language romantic comedy film, directed by Suraj Gowda, produced by Akshay Rajshekar and Ranganath Kudli, under the banner White and Grey Pictures. The film stars Suraj Gowda and Dhanya Ramkumar. It was released on 8 October 2021.

Cast 
 Suraj Gowda as Aditya 
 Dhanya Ramkumar as Amrutha 
 Aruna Balraj
 Manjunath Hegde
 Soumya Bhat

Production 
The official photoshoot of the film was done on 1 July 2019, the video clipping of which was published in leading Kannada news websites. The first look poster of Ninna Sanihake was released during its first official press meet on 5 August 2019. The shoot of the film started in August 2019 after the movie's Muhurat, launched by Sandalwood actors Puneeth Rajkumar and Raghavendra Rajkumar, and director Dinakar Thoogudeepa.

Music
The film's soundtrack is composed by Indian singer and composer Raghu Dixit.

Soundtrack

See also 

 List of Kannada films

References

External links 
 

2021 films
Indian romantic comedy films
Films shot in Karnataka
2020s Kannada-language films
Films set in universities and colleges
Films scored by Raghu Dixit